Typhoon most commonly denotes a specific form of tropical cyclone in the western Pacific Ocean.

Typhoon may also refer to:

Military
Typhoon-class submarine in the Soviet and Russian navies
Eurofighter Typhoon, a European-designed multirole combat aircraft
Hawker Typhoon, a British World War II aircraft
Messerschmitt Taifun, a German aircraft of the interwar period
Typhoon, the German codename for the military offensive directed against Moscow in 1941 (see Battle of Moscow)
Taifun (rocket), German World War II unguided anti-aircraft rocket system
RMAS Typhoon (A95), an ocean-going tug of the Royal Maritime Auxiliary Service
Typhoon Weapon System an Israeli stabilizer for cannon
Typhoon (AFV family), a Russian family of Mine-Resistant Ambush Protected (MRAP) armored vehicles
Kamaz Typhoon
Ural Typhoon
, a US Navy ship launched in 1993

Transportation
Armstrong Siddeley Typhoon, a two-door coupé car
FPV F6 Typhoon, a high-performance Australian sports sedan
GMC Typhoon, a high-performance sport-utility vehicle
Piaggio Typhoon, a motor scooter manufactured by Piaggio
Rambler Typhoon, a special version of the Rambler Classic two-door hardtop
Typhoon, a British steam locomotive operating on the Romney, Hythe and Dymchurch Railway
Typhoon 18, an American sailboat design
Typhoon Senior, an American sailboat design

Arts and media
Typhoon (novel), a 1902 novel by Joseph Conrad
Typhoon (play), a 1909 play  by Melchior Lengyel
Typhoon, a 1992 novel by Mark Joseph
De Typhoon, a Dutch local newspaper (1944–92)
Typhoon (comics), a DC Comics villain
Typhoon (1933 film), a German film directed by Robert Wiene
Typhoon (1940 film), an American film
Typhoon (2005 film), a 2005 South Korean action film
The Typhoon, a 1914 American film
Typhoon (American band), a band based in Portland, Oregon
Typhoon (South Korean band)
Typhoon (Korean singer)
Typhoon (rapper), a Dutch rapper
Typhoons (album), a 2021 Royal Blood album
Typhoon, a water coaster ride at Six Flags New England amusement park
Typhoon, the name outside Japan for the video game Ajax
Typhoon (simulator), a motion simulator created by Triotech Amusement
Typhoon Studios, a defunct Canadian video game developer

Sports
Typhoon II, winner of the 1897 Kentucky Derby
Typhoon, a nickname of the English cricketer Frank Tyson
Typhoon, stage name of American professional wrestler Fred Ottman
Typhoon, the nickname of Japanese mixed martial artist and current Rizin FF bantamweight champion Kyoji Horiguchi
Typhoons (women's cricket), an Irish women's cricket team

Other uses
HTC Typhoon, a Windows Mobile Smartphone
Typhoon (Bobbejaanland), a Gerstlauer Euro-Fighter model roller coaster at Bobbejaanland amusement park
Typhoo, a brand of tea in the United Kingdom

See also
Typhoon No.15 ~B'z Live-Gym The Final Pleasure "It's Showtime!!" in Nagisaen~, a live VHS/DVD by Japanese rock duo B'z
Typhoon shelter, a shelter for fishing boats during typhoons
Taifun (disambiguation)